The Grand Hotel Karel V is a hotel in Utrecht, Netherlands. It is located in the Duitse Huis complex of buildings, including part of the old monastery of the Bailiwick of Utrecht of the Teutonic Knights founded in 1348. Most of the rooms and suites are in a former military hospital, which dates from 1823 and has been carefully renovated, or in the modern Roman wing opened in 2008. The hotel contains a Roman-themed health center, conference rooms (Events Karel 5), a bar, Bistro Karel 5 and Restaurant Karel 5. It is set in extensive grounds.

Building history

In 1348 the Bailiwick of Utrecht of the noble Teutonic Order (Ridderlijke Duitse Orde Balije van Utrecht) built the Duitse Huis as a monastery and headquarters between the Utrecht city wall and Springweg. In the sixteenth century, Charles the Fifth (Karl V), who was emperor of the German Empire, king of Spain and sovereign ruler of the seventeen Netherlands' provinces, stayed at this monastery which by then also served as a hospital. By 1580, when the Reformation was introduced in Utrecht, the Teutonic Order converted to Protestantism but it maintained the building as a hospital.
Napoleon's brother Louis Bonaparte bought the property in 1807 and the Teutonic Order left the premises.
During the reign of King William I of the Netherlands a military hospital was built on the property along the Geertebolwerk.
For its time, the hospital was very modern.
It was completed in 1823.

When the hospital became vacant in the late 1980s the Bailiwick of Utrecht was able to repurchase the property.
A major renovation was started in 1992.
In 1995 the Bailiwick of Utrecht moved back into the 15th century Commander's house on the corner of Springweg and Walsteeg.
Further renovations converted much of the rest of the complex into a hotel and restaurant by 1999.
The building was restored with help from the National Restoration Fund.
The hospital's wards were converted into hotel rooms and suites.
As far as possible the old fabric and appearance were preserved.

The garden wing was renovated and extended in 2007. During the excavation archaeologists discovered the remains of a Roman cemetery dating to between 40 BC and 275 AD, which may be associated with the Roman fort of Traiectum. The wing was called the Roman wing after this discovery.
The Roman Wing is called "contemporary" by reviewers, in contrast to the "cleverly modernized" main building.
It was designed by the Heine & van de Rijt architectural firm and Hylkema Consultants. The wing has a modern pavilion and extension of the existing garden wing.
It was formally opened in November 2008 with a ceremony that included marching Roman soldiers.

Facilities

The Grand Hotel Karel V opened in 1999.
It is named after the Emperor Charles V, who once visited the Duitse Huis. A formal opening ceremony with the mayor of Utrecht and a representative of the queen was held on 10 September 2000. 
At this ceremony the hotel received its five star rating, the first in the Utrecht region. The hotel has 121 rooms, conference rooms, a health center, bar, bistro and restaurant. The auditorium seats 114 people. There is an unobtrusive sound system in the conference facility and public areas of the hotel.

The hotel has three wings. The Medieval Wing is in the center, the Napoleonic Wing to the west and the Roman Wing to the south. The "wellness center" in the basement of the Roman wing has a "Roman" motif, with a sauna, steam room and swimming pool. Some of the finds from Roman times are exhibited in the wing.
Traces of the past history of the complex, including objects, photographs and historical drawings, are displayed throughout the hotel. The hotel is set in extensive gardens.

Restaurants

Bistro Karel 5 is in the former convent kitchen, and has a terrace that is open in good weather.
The chapter room and refectory of the main building of the medieval Duitse Huis are now also dining areas.
The remains of a fireplace were found during the renovation on which the double-headed eagle, the emblem of Charles V, was engraved in sandstone.
A new fireplace was built in the refectory in the same place as the old fireplace, decorated with the coat of arms and motto of the Emperor Charles V.

A 2004 guide said the Bistro Karel 5 could be enjoyed in a casual atmosphere, and the classic Restaurant Karel 5 offered an excellent choice.
Restaurant Karel 5 received a Michelin star in 2005, but lost it in 2013 after a change in chefs.
Restaurant Karel 5 held the star in the period 2005–2013.
As of June 2014 Gault Millau showed the restaurant rating as 14 points.

See also

Notes

Citations

Sources

 

 

Hotels in the Netherlands
1999 establishments in the Netherlands
Hotels established in 1999
Rijksmonuments in Utrecht (city)
Hospital buildings completed in 1823
Buildings and structures in Utrecht (city)
20th-century architecture in the Netherlands